Premium Platform Electric (PPE) is a modular car platform for electric cars being developed by Volkswagen Group brands Audi and Porsche. The platform will be for larger electric vehicles which are not suitable for the Volkswagen Group MEB platform, although Audi will also build cars with the smaller platform. Details of the platform were first revealed in 2019, with Audi noting that it would have 2/3 assembling commonality with the MLB Evo platform. The first car officially announced for PPE was the Audi A6 e-tron.

Details 
The car reportedly has a  WLTP range, with an 800V electrical architecture that allows DC fast charging at up to 270kW. In November 2022, it was revealed that the architecture allowed rear or four-wheel drive, with power up to 450kW.  The batteries run at 800V, but can split into 2 400V packs for further charging.

Models 
 Audi A6 e-tron (production commencing 2022)

Prototypes 
 Porsche 718 GT4 ePerformance

See also 
 Volkswagen Group MEB platform
 Volkswagen Group Scalable Systems Platform
 List of Volkswagen Group platforms

References

External links
Volkswagen Group corporate website

Electric vehicle platforms
Premium Platform Electric